Dr. Wesley Muhammad born June 14 in Detroit, Michigan is an American author and a minister in the Nation of Islam. He received a Bachelor of Arts in Religious Studies from Morehouse College (Atlanta, GA), graduating with honors in 1994. In 2003 received a master's degree in Islamic Studies from the University of Michigan (Ann Arbor), whence he also received a Ph.D. in Islamic Studies with a focus on Early Theological Development in Islam.

Muhammad's research has been published in the International Journal of Middle East Studies, the Journal of the American Oriental Society, and the American Journal of Islamic Social Sciences. He has been an instructor on courses on Islamic Studies, Religious Studies, African American Religion, and Middle Eastern Studies at  the University of Toledo and Michigan State University.

In 2013 he was a scholarly aide to Minister Louis Farrakhan at Nation of Islam National Headquarters Mosque Maryam in Chicago.

In 2021 he made an appearance in the documentary Buck Breaking.

Bibliography

References

External links

1972 births
Living people
Five percenters
Nation of Islam
21st-century American historians
21st-century American male writers
Writers from Detroit
Morehouse College alumni
University of Michigan alumni
Historians from Michigan
American male non-fiction writers
21st-century African-American writers
African-American male writers